There are several rivers named Formiga River in Brazil:

 Formiga River (Mato Grosso)
 Formiga River (Tocantins)

See also
 Formiga (disambiguation)